Hasselø Plantage is a coastal village located  south of Nykøbing on the Danish island of Falster. As of 2022, it has a population of 222.

History 
Hasselø was once an island but since dikes were built in 1873 it has been a part of Falster. Around 1600, on the initiative of Queen Sophie, the wife of King Frederick II, a colony of Dutchmen was established on Hasselø to supply Nykøbing Palace with vegetables. During the Second World War, the Germans operated a radar station and surveillance facilities in Hasselø.

References 

Falster
Cities and towns in Region Zealand
Guldborgsund Municipality